Vinyl Cafe Unplugged (2000) is Stuart McLean's third volume of stories that first aired on the CBC Radio program The Vinyl Cafe. In 2001, it won the Stephen Leacock Award for Humour.  This was the second time that Stuart McLean had won for his writings on The Vinyl Cafe.

Stories included in Vinyl Cafe Unplugged:
Arthur
Galway
The Fly
Christmas Presents
Harrison Ford's Toes
Dorothy
The Last Kind Word Blues
The Bare Truth
Susan is Serious
Odd Jobs
The Razor's Edge
Morley's Christmas Pageant 
Figs
Love Never Ends

See also
List of Dave and Morley stories

References

External links
Stuart McLean profile at cbc.ca
The Vinyl Cafe website

2000 short story collections
Short story collections by Stuart McLean